Brigadier Andrew Skeen  ( – 11 May 1984) was a British Army officer, and Rhodesian politician who served as the last High Commissioner from Rhodesia to the United Kingdom.

Early life and career

Born in India, Skeen was the son of General Sir Andrew Skeen. He was commissioned into the British Army in 1926, rising to the rank of Brigadier. He retired from the British Army in 1947 and moved to the self-governing colony of Southern Rhodesia and settled in Vumba in Umtali district. Skeen opposed the creation of the Federation of Rhodesia and Nyasaland in 1953, as he saw it as not in the best interests of the white community in Southern Rhodesia, and by 1962, Skeen had joined the Rhodesian Front party of Ian Smith.

High Commissioner

Skeen served as the High Commissioner for Rhodesia in London from 22 July to 12 November 1965. His total tenure lasted 115 days.

On 11 November 1965, when Rhodesia announced its Unilateral Declaration of Independence (UDI), Skeen was summoned by the Secretary of State for Commonwealth Relations, Arthur Bottomley, for a meeting at 1.15pm, who ordered Skeen to denounce the UDI or face being declared  with the removal of all privileges and expulsion from 13 November.  Skeen refused and departed London voluntarily the following day on 12 November 1965, although Rhodesia House (the High Commission) continued to function as a representative office with no official diplomatic status. Skeen's functions were assumed by  Sydney Brice, who was officially regarded as "The Southern Rhodesian Representative" by the British Foreign Office.

Later life

On his return from London, Skeen was elected unopposed to the Southern Rhodesian Legislative Assembly (the House of Assembly from 1970) seat of Arundel in the 14 January 1966 by-election caused by the resignation of Clifford Dupont who had been appointed Officer Administering the Government after the UDI. He was re-elected for a second term at the 1970 general election but stood down at the 1974 general election and was succeeded by another former serviceman, Air Marshal Archibald Wilson.

Honours

References 

1900s births
1984 deaths
British Army officers
British Army personnel of World War II
Officers of the Order of the British Empire
White Rhodesian people
High Commissioners of Rhodesia to the United Kingdom
Members of the Legislative Assembly of Southern Rhodesia
Members of the Parliament of Rhodesia
Rhodesian expatriates in the United Kingdom
Rhodesian Front politicians
Rhodesian politicians